Kujan (also Romanized as Kūjān; also known as Koojan Dezmar, Kudzhyan, Kūjeyān, and Kujian) is a village in Dizmar-e Markazi Rural District, Kharvana District, Varzaqan County, East Azerbaijan Province, Iran. At the 2006 census, its population was 54, in 12 families.

References 

Towns and villages in Varzaqan County